Andrew James "Swede" Oberlander (February 17, 1905 – January 1, 1968) was an American football player and coach. He was an All-American halfback for Dartmouth College's Indians undefeated and national championship football team in 1925. Oberlander was inducted into the College Football Hall of Fame as a player in 1954.

Dartmouth College
Oberlander was converted to halfback from the tackle position, and had a "terrific straight arm". In 1925, Oberlander passed for 14 touchdowns and ran for 12. Dartmouth defeated Harvard 32–9, its best victory to date over the Crimson. In a 62–13 victory over Cornell, Oberlander had 477 yards in total offense, including six touchdown passes, a Dartmouth record which still stands. He was responsible for some 500 yards of total offense. Cornell coach Gil Dobie responded "We won the game 13–0, passing is not football." The season closed with a 33–7 victory over defending Big Ten champion Chicago. Oberlander threw three touchdowns.

Coaching career
Oberlander was an assistant coach at Ohio State University from 1926 to 1929 and head coach at Wesleyan University from 1930 to 1933.  While at Wesleyan, he commuted to New Haven and received his MD from Yale School of Medicine.

World War II
In World War II, as a Lt. Commander in the United States Navy Reserve, he was chief medical officer aboard the USS Samaritan (AH-10), in the Pacific Fleet. When the war ended, many U.S. troops remained in the Far East awaiting transportation back to the States. Oberlander was head coach of the Navy All-Stars team that beat the Army team 12–0 in the China Bowl on November 30, 1945, in Shanghai.

Insurance
Later, Oberlander served as Medical Director for National Life Insurance Company of Vermont and Prudential Insurance Company in Chicago and Newark.

References

External links
 

1905 births
1968 deaths
American football halfbacks
Dartmouth Big Green football players
Ohio State Buckeyes football coaches
Wesleyan Cardinals football coaches
All-American college football players
College Football Hall of Fame inductees
United States Navy personnel of World War II
Yale School of Medicine alumni
Prudential Financial people
American people of Swedish descent
United States Navy Medical Corps officers
Sportspeople from Chelsea, Massachusetts